Tecticrater is a genus of very small deepwater limpets, marine gastropod molluscs in the family Lepetellidae.

Species
Species in the genus Tecticrater include:
 Tecticrater cervae (Fleming, 1948)
 Tecticrater compressa (Suter, 1908)
 Tecticrater finlayi (Powell, 1937)
 Tecticrater grandis Crozier, 1966
 Tecticrater subcompressa (Powell, 1937)

References

 Powell A. W. B., New Zealand Mollusca, William Collins Publishers Ltd, Auckland, New Zealand 1979 
 mollusca.co.nz
 GBIF

Lepetellidae
Gastropods of New Zealand